Thomas Brockhill (d. c. 1411) was an English politician.

Life
Brockhill was probably a younger son (or nephew) of Thomas Brockhill of Saltwood, near Hythe, MP for Kent, and thus the brother of MP John Brockhill. He had one wife, Joan, and one daughter.

The family's name is still remembered in Saltwood's secondary school, Brockhill Park Performing Arts College and Brockhill Country Park.

Career
Brockhill was appointed High Sheriff of Kent for the period May 1383 to November 1384 and was elected Member of Parliament for Kent in October 1382, 1385, 1395, January 1397, 1399 and 1402.

References

Year of birth missing
1411 deaths
People from Hythe, Kent
14th-century births
Thomas
High Sheriffs of Kent
English MPs October 1382
English MPs 1385
English MPs 1395
English MPs January 1397
English MPs 1399
English MPs 1402